11:30 was a Canadian dance-pop duo from Montreal that consisted of identical twin sisters Toni and Trish Sherwood (born in 1980; the 11:30 refers to their birthdate, November 30).They are known for their hit single, “Olé Olé”.

History
In 2000, the twins were signed to Aquarius Records and released their album, Olé Olé. The song "Olé Olé" was written and produced by their father, Dorian Sherwood, and was a Canadian top ten hit.

In 2001, 11:30 toured as an opening act for Aaron Carter. They also traveled to Sydney, Australia. Aquarius Records put together a group of musicians called 'Team Aquarius', which traveled to the 2000 Summer Olympics to help boost Toronto's bid for the 2008 Olympic Games.

In 2003, their song "Let's Go All Night" appeared on Latino Summer Dance 3, a dance album produced by the Russian label Tancevalnij Raj. "Olé Olé" and "Let's Go All Night" would appear on two other compilation albums by the same label.

In 2010, Toni Sherwood released the solo album Stop.

Discography

Singles

References

External links

Upcoming event announcement from Montreal Mirror  at the Wayback Machine.

Musical groups established in 1999
Musical groups disestablished in 2001
Musical groups from Montreal
Canadian dance music groups
Canadian Eurodance groups
Canadian girl groups
Twin musical duos
Canadian musical duos
Identical twin females
1999 establishments in Canada
Anglophone Quebec people